Xu Yunli (born 2 August 1987) is a Chinese volleyball player. She was part of the gold medal winning team at the 2006 Asian Games and the silver medal winning team at the 2007 World Grand Prix.

Career
Xu played at the 2013 Club World Championship with Guangdong Evergrande winning the bronze medal after defeating Voléro Zürich 3-1.

Clubs
  Fujian Xi Meng Bao (2005-2012)
  Guangdong Evergrande (2012-2013)
  Fujian Xi Meng Bao (2013-2017)

Awards

Individuals
 2012 Asian Cup "Best Blocker"
 2013 Asian Club Championship "Most Valuable Player"
 2013 Asian Club Championship "Best Blocker"
 2013 Asian Championship "Best Blocker"

Clubs
 2013 Asian Club Championship -  Champion, with Guangdong Evergrande
 2013 Club World Championship -  Bronze medal, with Guangdong Evergrande

See also
China at the 2012 Summer Olympics#Volleyball
Volleyball at the 2012 Summer Olympics – Women's tournament

References

External links
Profile

1987 births
Living people
Sportspeople from Fuzhou
Chinese women's volleyball players
Olympic gold medalists for China in volleyball
Volleyball players at the 2008 Summer Olympics
Volleyball players at the 2012 Summer Olympics
Volleyball players at the 2016 Summer Olympics
Olympic bronze medalists for China
Medalists at the 2008 Summer Olympics
2016 Olympic gold medalists for China
Asian Games medalists in volleyball
Volleyball players at the 2006 Asian Games
Volleyball players at the 2010 Asian Games
Asian Games gold medalists for China
Volleyball players from Fujian

Medalists at the 2006 Asian Games
Medalists at the 2010 Asian Games
Middle blockers
21st-century Chinese women